This article contains information about the literary events and publications of 1844.

Events
February 5 – The first three of many theatrical adaptations of A Christmas Carol open in London.
March–July – Alexandre Dumas père's historical adventure story The Three Musketeers (Les Trois Mousquetaires) is serialised in the Paris newspaper Le Siècle.
August 28 – Alexandre Dumas père's near-recent historical adventure story The Count of Monte Cristo (Le Comte de Monte-Cristo) begins serialization in the Paris newspaper Journal des débats, and continues through to January 1846. Book publication also begins this year.
October – George W. M. Reynolds begins publication of the bestselling "penny dreadful" city mysteries series The Mysteries of London.
Autumn – Margaret Fuller joins Horace Greeley's New-York Tribune as literary critic, becoming the first full-time female book reviewer in American journalism.
December 2 – Emily Brontë writes the poem "A Death-Scene".
unknown date – The first volumes of Patrologia Latina, a 217-volume collection of works in Latin, are published in Paris by Jacques Paul Migne. These include the writings of Tertullian and Cyprian, among other authors.

New books

Fiction
José de Alencar – Os contrabandistas (unpublished, lost)
Honoré de Balzac – Les Paysans
Charles Dickens
The Chimes
Martin Chuzzlewit (serial publication ends)
Benjamin Disraeli – Coningsby
Alexandre Dumas
The Count of Monte Cristo
The Three Musketeers
Charles Lever – Tom Burke of Ours
Joaquim Manuel de Macedo – A Moreninha
Edgar Allan Poe – short stories
"The Angel of the Odd"
"The Premature Burial"
G. W. M. Reynolds – The Mysteries of London
Eugène Sue – The Wandering Jew (Le Juif Errant)
William Makepeace Thackeray – The Luck of Barry Lyndon
Charlotte Elizabeth Tonna – The Wrongs of Women
Charlotte Mary Yonge – Abbeychurch, or, Self Control and Self Conceit

Children and young people
Heinrich Hoffmann – Struwwelpeter
Frederick Marryat – Settlers in Canada
Elizabeth Missing Sewell – Amy Herbert
Hans Christian Andersen – New Fairy Tales. First Volume. Second Collection (Nye Eventyr. Første Bind. Anden Samling) comprising "The Fir-Tree" ("Grantræet") and "The Snow Queen" ("Snedronningen")

Drama
Émile Augier – La Ciguë
Gustav Freytag – Die Brautfahrt, oder Kunz von der Rosen
Christian Friedrich Hebbel – Maria Magdalene
William H. Smith – The Drunkard
José Zorilla – Don Juan Tenorio

Poetry
Elizabeth Barrett Browning – Poems
Lydia Maria Child – "Over the River and Through the Wood"
Heinrich Heine – Neue Gedichte
James Russell Lowell – Poems
Coventry Patmore – Poems

Non-fiction
Robert Chambers (anonymously) – Vestiges of the Natural History of Creation
Friedrich Engels – The Condition of the Working Class in England (Die Lage der arbeitenden Klasse in England)
Joseph Ennemoser – Geschichte der Magie (History of Magic)
Søren Kierkegaard (as Vigilius Haufniensis) – The Concept of Anxiety (Begrebet Angest)
Karl Marx – "On the Jewish Question" ("Zur Judenfrage")
John Stuart Mill – Essays on Some Unsettled Questions of Political Economy
William Smith (editor) – Dictionary of Greek and Roman Biography and Mythology
Arthur Penrhyn Stanley – Life of Arnold
Max Stirner – The Ego and Its Own (Der Einzige und sein Eigentum)
Henry Fox Talbot – The Pencil of Nature (first book illustrated with photographs from a camera)

Births
January 2 – Emeline Harriet Howe, American writer and social activist (died 1934)
January 8 – Sarah Carmichael Harrell, American educator, reformer, and writer (died 1929)
January 14 – Susan F. Ferree, American writer and activist (died 1910)
February 25 – Alice Diehl (née Mangold), English novelist and concert pianist (died 1912)
March 30 – Paul Verlaine, French lyric poet (died 1896)
April 2 – George Haven Putnam, American author, publisher (died 1930)
April 16 – Anatole France, French writer (died 1924)
April 12 – Mollie Evelyn Moore Davis, American poet, writer, and editor (died 1909)
May 9 – Sarah Newcomb Merrick, American teacher, writer, and physician (unknown year of death)
July 8 – Janet Milne Rae, Scottish novelist (died 1933)
July 21 – Matilda Maranda Crawford, American-Canadian writer and poet (died 1920)
July 22 – William Archibald Spooner, English academic and instigator of spoonerisms (died 1930)
July 28 – Gerard Manley Hopkins, English poet (died 1889)
August 29 – Edward Carpenter, English socialist poet and philosopher (died 1929)
September 9 – Maurice Thompson, American novelist (died 1901)
October 1 – H. Maria George Colby, American author of novelettes and juvenile literature (died 1910)
October 6 – Margret Holmes Bates, American novelist and poet (died 1927)
October 15 – Friedrich Nietzsche, German philosopher (died 1900)
October 22 or 23 – Sarah Bernhardt, French actress (died 1923)
October 23
Robert Bridges, English poet (died 1930)
 Laura Rosamond White, American author, poet, editor (died 1922)
October 25 – Joseph Marmette, Canadian novelist and historian (died 1895)
October 27 – Klas Pontus Arnoldson, Swedish writer and pacifist (died 1916)
November 21 – Ada Cambridge, English/Australian writer and poet (died 1926)
December 13 – Catharine H. T. Avery, American author, editor, and educator (died 1911)
December 27 – Lisa Anne Fletcher, American poet and correspondent (died 1905)
unknown dates
Mrs. Lovett Cameron (Caroline "Emily" Sharp), English romantic novelist (died 1921)
Evelyn Whitaker, English children's writer (died 1929)

Deaths
January 4 – Maria Hack, English educational writer (born 1777)
January 27 – Charles Nodier, French novelist (born 1780)
February 11 – Tamenaga Shunsui, Japanese novelist (born 1790)
February 12 – Jan Nepomuk Štěpánek, Czech dramatist (born 1783)
May 2 – William Thomas Beckford, English novelist and travel writer (born 1760)
June 11 – Urban Jarnik, Slovene poet and historian (born 1784)
June 15 – Thomas Campbell, Scottish poet (born 1777)
July 11 – Evgeny Baratynsky, Russian poet and philosopher (born 1800)
August 14 – Henry Cary, Gibraltar-born Irish author and translator (born 1772)
September 18 – John Sterling, Scottish novelist and poet (born 1806)
October 28 – Sándor Kisfaludy, Hungarian poet and dramatist (born 1772)
November 4 – Barbara Hofland, English children's and schoolbook author (born 1770)
November 21 – Ivan Krylov, Russian fabulist (born 1769)
December 27 – Ioan Caragea, Greek Prince of Wallachia, translator and theatrical promoter (born 1754)

Awards
Chancellor's Gold Medal – Edward Bickersteth, "The Tower of London"
Newdigate Prize – Evgeny Baratynsky

References

 
Years of the 19th century in literature